"Fear Is a Liar" is the third single from Christian rock artist Zach Williams from his debut studio album Chain Breaker. The song peaked at No. 3 on the Hot Christian Songs chart. It lasted 31 weeks on the overall chart.

Background
"Fear Is a Liar" was released as the third single from "Chain Breaker" on January 19, 2018, accompanied with a music video. The song's message is about maturing with God's love, and coming to the point that there is nothing to fear. The song was written by Williams, along with Jason Ingram, Jonathan Lindley Smith and Eric Pollock.

Music video
The official music video was released on January 19, 2018, on Zach Williams' Vevo channel.

The music video depicts multiple situations where a person is in doubt and fear, while Zach Williams sings in the background.

Track listing

Charts

Weekly charts

Year-end charts

Certifications

References

2018 singles
2016 songs
Songs written by Jason Ingram